Los astronautas is a 1964 Mexican comic science fiction film directed by Miguel Zacarías and starring the double act Viruta y Capulina, performed by Marco Antonio Campos and Gaspar Henaine.

Plot
In the women-ruled planet of Venus, the Union Leader of the Oppressed Husbands Syndicate wants to revert the power of leadership back to the men and threatens to initiate a strike if his will is not heard. However, the female leader of Venus believes otherwise and asserts that male dominion will only cause war and disruption. Therefore, she sends Lieutenant Laúr and Sergeant Rauna on a mission to choose two male earthlings who can prove to be more useful than Venusian men, so that they can bring more of them to Venus. When Laúr and Rauna choose Viruta and Capulina, two amateur singers who work in a gymnasium, they are intercepted by their constant rivals the Martians who claim that Earth is a satellite of Mars and therefore it should not be intruded by Venusians. Capulina manages to steal a super-power locket from a Martian which allows him to scare them off. He and Viruta later marry the Venusian women Laur and Rauna and then travel to the Moon for their honeymoon.

Cast
Marco Antonio Campos as Viruta 
Gaspar Henaine as Capulina 
Gina Romand as Laúr, Lieutenant X7
Norma Mora as Rauna, Sergeant X8
Erna Martha Bauman as Female Leader of Venus
Antonio Raxel as Gymnasium Manager
Armando Sáenz as Lombard, Union Leader of the Oppressed Husbands Syndicate
Tito Novaro as Martian
Jorge Casanova as Gymnasium Orator

Production
The film was shot from 1 to 2 November 1960, in Estudios Churubusco. The film's working titles were Turistas interplanetarios and Dos viajeros del espacio.

See also
List of films featuring extraterrestrials

References

External links
 

1964 films
1960s science fiction comedy films
Films about astronauts
Films about extraterrestrial life
Mexican science fiction comedy films
Venus in film
Films with screenplays by Roberto Gómez Bolaños
1964 comedy films
1960s Mexican films